Nicholas Verity Knight (born 28 November 1969) is an English cricket commentator and former England cricketer.  A left-handed opening batsman and a fine fielder, Knight played in 17 Test Matches and 100 One Day Internationals before announcing his retirement from international cricket after the 2003 World Cup.

Early life and domestic career
Born in Watford, Hertfordshire, Knight was given his middle name in honour of the 1930s English Test bowler Hedley Verity who was killed in World War II and is a distant family relation.  He was educated at Felsted School in Essex and Loughborough University and was an outstanding cricketer from an early age. He won the Daily Telegraph 'Young Cricketer of the Year' award in 1989 and played cricket for Brentwood cricket club from 1989 to 1991. In domestic cricket, he began his career with Essex in 1991 before transferring to Warwickshire four years later. He was captain of Warwickshire from 2003 to 2005, and led them to victory in the County Championship in the 2004 season. He retired from first-class cricket after the 2006 season and became a member of the Sky Sports cricket commentary team. He finished his first-class career with 16,172 runs at 44.18 and 40 hundreds. His highest score was an unbeaten 303 against Middlesex at Lord's in 2004.

International career

Test Cricket
Knight struggled in the Test arena and made only one Test century, an innings of 113 against Pakistan at Headingley in 1996. His next best score was 96 against Zimbabwe in a drawn game at Bulawayo in 1996–97. The most obvious reason for this was his technique. Never afraid of genuine fast bowling, his footwork was often not decisive enough which caused him at times to appear to be backing away from short balls and his test innings frequently ended giving a catch to the slips or the wicket-keeper. As a fine fielder and a hard worker, it is surprising that he did not play more for England – the England team was not blessed with too many good batsman during Knight's era. However two of the better batsmen were Michael Atherton and Mark Butcher with whom Knight was vying for a place for most of his career. Atherton too was captain of England until 1998 so would have been an automatic choice for opening batsman.

One Day Internationals

Knight was a far more successful, and certainly regular, one-day player for England. In one-day cricket, this backing away in fact helped him score a lot of runs and became something of a hallmark. This same strength/weakness was mirrored in Michael Bevan – one of Knight's contemporaries.

Debuting in 1996, he scored centuries in his second and third innings in ODI cricket, on consecutive days against a Pakistan bowling attack that included Wasim Akram and Waqar Younis. Nick Knight set a world record for the highest ever ODI innings by a batsman when carrying his bat through his innings (125*) when he achieved it v Pakistan in 1996  He was also the first Englishman to  carry his bat in an ODI innings.

Knight wasn't selected for the World Cup team in 1999 and made his World Cup debut in the 2003 tournament. He performed well in an unsuccessful campaign for England and faced the first delivery in cricket officially to break the 100 mph barrier, bowled by Shoaib Akhtar. He "pushed it nonchalantly to square leg."

Post-retirement
Following his retirement from cricket, Knight became a commentator and pundit on Sky Sports.

Notes

External links

English cricketers
1969 births
Living people
England Test cricketers
England One Day International cricketers
Cricketers at the 1999 Cricket World Cup
Cricketers at the 2003 Cricket World Cup
Essex cricketers
Warwickshire cricketers
Warwickshire cricket captains
English cricket commentators
People educated at Felsted School
Sportspeople from Watford
Alumni of Loughborough University
British Universities cricketers
First-Class Counties Select XI cricketers